This page describes the knockout stage of the 2013–14 EHF Champions League.

Last 16 
The draw was held on 25 February 2014 at 12:00 in Vienna, Austria. The first legs will be played on 20–23 March, and the second legs on 29–31 March 2014.

Seedings

Matches 

|}

First leg

Second leg 

Veszprém won 64–60 on aggregate.

Flensburg won 55–53 on aggregate.

Barcelona won 60–42 on aggregate.

Metalurg won 53–43 on aggregate.

Paris won 62–55 on aggregate.

Kiel won 71–56 on aggregate.

Vardar won 58–57 on aggregate.

55–55 on aggregate. Rhein-Neckar Löwen won on away goals.

Quarterfinals 
The draw was held on 1 April 2014 at 12:15 in Vienna, Austria. The first legs were played on 19–21 April, and the second legs on 26–27 April 2014.

Seedings

Matches 

|}

First leg

Second leg 

Veszprém won 52–59 on aggregate.

49–49 on aggregate. Flensburg won on away goals.

62–62 on aggregate. Barcelona won on away goals.

Kiel won 65–47 on aggregate.

Final four 
The draw was held on 29 April 2014.

Bracket

Semifinals 

Flensburg won the penalty shootout 5–3.

Third place game

Final

References

External links 
 Official website

knockout stage